Tom Murphy is a professor of physics at the University of California, San Diego. He is the project investigator for the Apache Point Observatory Lunar Laser-ranging Operation Project. Professor Murphy completed his Ph.D. in astrophysics at the California Institute of Technology after which he completed a postdoc at the University of Washington - Seattle before becoming a professor at the University of California, San Diego. In 2010 his group was responsible for locating the former Soviet Union's Lunokhod 1 rover.

Dr. Murphy is also known for his blog, "Do The Math" "which takes an astrophysicist’s-eye view of societal issues relating to energy production, climate change, and economic growth."

In 2021 Dr. Murphy published Energy and Human Ambitions on a Finite Planet  textbook, a physics open educational resource (OER) that include a version optimized for printing.

References

External links
 Decades-Old Soviet Reflector Spotted on the Moon

Living people
Year of birth missing (living people)
American astrophysicists
University of California, San Diego faculty
California Institute of Technology alumni